Catherine of Mecklenburg (1487 – 6 June 1561, Torgau), was a Duchess of Saxony by marriage to Henry IV, Duke of Saxony. She was the daughter of the Duke Magnus II of Mecklenburg and Sophie of Pomerania-Stettin.

Life 
She married on 6 July 1512 in Freiberg Duke Henry the Pious of Saxony. 

Catherine sympathized early with Martin Luther's teachings, while her husband suppressed the Reformation until 1536 for fear of his brother, the reigning Duke George the Bearded.  Later, the Freiberg area became Lutheran.

When duke George tried bear down on Catherine, she told the envoy: You could do me a big favor by leaving Freiberg right now.  In 1539, after the death of Duke George, the couple moved to Dresden and brought the Reformation there.  Duke Henry died on 18 August 1541; Catherine outlived him by 20 years.  She spent her days in Wolkenstein castle.  In 1560, she published a book on etiquette for ladies, which is culturally and historically very interesting.

Issue
She had six children with Henry the Pious:

 Sibylle (1515–1592)
 married in 1540 Duke Francis I of Saxe-Lauenburg (1510–1581)
 Aemilia (1516–1591)
 married in 1533 Margrave George the Pious of Brandenburg-Ansbach (1484–1534)
 Sidonie (1518–1575)
 married in 1545 Duke Eric II of Brunswick-Lüneburg (1528–1584)
 Maurice (1521–1553), Elector of Saxony
 married in 1541 princess Agnes of Hesse (1527–1555)
 Severinus (1522–1533)
 Augustus (1526–1586), Elector of Saxony
 married in 1548 princess Anne of Denmark and Norway (1532–1585)

Ancestry

References 
 
 Franz Otto Stichart: Gallery of the Saxon princesses. Biographical sketches of all the ancestress of the royal house of Saxony, Fleischer, Leipzig, 1857, p. 229-247 (Google Book Search).
 Theodor Distel: News on the Duchess Catherine of Saxony and her people In: New archive for Saxon history (NASG), Volume 15, 1894, p. 326 ff. (digitized).
 John Meyer: Female characters and women's sway in the House of Wettin, Weller, Bautzen, 1912.
 Sabine Ulbricht: princesses in the Saxon History (1382-1622), Sax, Beucha/Markham, 2010, p. 99-125.

See also
Portraits of Henry IV of Saxony and Catherine of Mecklenburg

|-
 

 

House of Mecklenburg
1487 births
1561 deaths
Duchesses of Saxony
⚭Catherine of Mecklenburg
Burials at Freiberg Cathedral
16th-century German women writers
Daughters of monarchs